Eric Tait (born 17 June 1951) is an English former football player and manager.

Football career
Tait's footballing career started at East of Scotland League side Coldstream. He joined the Berwick Rangers in 1969, remaining with the club for nineteen years. He holds the club records both for number of appearances (435) and goals scored (114) in Scottish League matches. During his time at the club he played in every position, including goalkeeper, and acted as player-manager between 1983 and 1987.

After leaving Berwick in 1988 he coached Morpeth Town and had a spell as manager of Newcastle Blue Star in Northern League Division One.

References

1951 births
Living people
Footballers from Northumberland
English footballers
English football managers
Berwick Rangers F.C. players
Berwick Rangers F.C. managers
Scottish Football League managers
Newcastle Blue Star F.C. managers
Association football utility players
Coldstream F.C. players